USS Colorado (BB-45) was a battleship of the United States Navy that was in service from 1923 to 1947. Her keel was laid down on 29 May 1919, by the New York Shipbuilding Corporation. She was launched on 22 March 1921, and commissioned on 30 August 1923. She was armed with eight  guns and fourteen 5-inch (127 mm) deck guns; two 5-inch guns were removed in an overhaul.

Colorado took her maiden voyage in 1923, to Europe. She later operated with the Battle Fleet and sailed through the Pacific during the interwar years. She also underwent a further refit, during which her four  anti-aircraft guns were replaced with an equal number of /25 cal guns.

During World War II, in May 1942, soon after USA's entry into the war, Colorado undertook a defensive patrol near the Golden Gate Bridge  to stop a possible Japanese invasion. She then sailed to Fiji, to stop any further Japanese advance into the Pacific. Next, she supported the landings on Tarawa, the Marshall Islands, Saipan, Guam, and Tinian. On 24 July 1944, during the shelling of Tinian, Colorado received 22 shell hits from shore batteries, but continued to support the invading troops until 3 August. She later arrived in Leyte Gulf on 20 November 1944, to support American troops fighting ashore. On 27 November, she was hit by two kamikazes which caused moderate damage.

After that, Colorado sailed to Luzon on 1 January 1945, where she participated in the preinvasion bombardments in Lingayen Gulf. She returned to Okinawa on 6 August and sailed from there to Japan for the occupation of the country, arriving in Tokyo on 27 August. Departing Tokyo Bay on 20 September, she arrived at San Francisco on 15 October. She was placed out of commission in reserve in Pearl Harbor on 7 January 1947, and sold for scrapping on 23 July 1959. She won seven battle stars during her service. Many of Colorados anti-aircraft guns are in museums across the state of Colorado (her bell and teak decking are also in museums and the USO in the Seattle-Tacoma airport) or mounted on the museum ship .

Design 

In 1916, design work was completed on the next class of battleships to be built for the United States Navy beginning in 1917. These ships were nearly direct copies of the preceding , with the exception of the main battery, which increased from twelve  guns to eight  guns. The Colorado class proved to be the last class of battleships completed of the standard type.

The ship was powered by four General Electric turbo-electric drives with steam provided by eight oil-fired Babcock & Wilcox boilers. Her crew numbered 64 officers and 1,241 enlisted men.

She was armed with a main battery of eight 16 in /45 caliber Mark 1 guns in four twin-gun turrets on the centerline, two forward and two aft in superfiring pairs. The secondary battery consisted of sixteen /51 caliber guns, mounted individually in casemates clustered in the superstructure amidships. She carried an anti-aircraft battery of eight /50 caliber guns in individual high-angle mounts. As was customary for capital ships of the period, she had a  torpedo tube mounted in her hull below the waterline on each broadside.

Service history

Inter-war period 

Her keel was laid down on 29 May 1919 by the New York Shipbuilding Corporation of Camden, New Jersey. Named for the 38th state, she was launched on 22 March 1921 and commissioned on 30 August 1923 for her initial sea trials and training. The ship's first commanding officer was Captain Reginald R. Belknap. On 29 December 1923, Colorado departed New York, bound for Portsmouth in the United Kingdom. She thereafter sailed south to visit Cherbourg and then Villefranche-sur-Mer, France. She also stopped in Naples, Italy, and the British naval base at Gibraltar. She arrived back in New York on 15 February 1924. There, the ship underwent repairs and further testing before getting underway on 11 July for the West Coast of the United States. She reached San Francisco, California on 15 September, where she joined the Battle Fleet. She remained a part of this unit for the next fifteen years.

Over the course of the 1920s and 1930s, Colorado took part in the series of Fleet Problems, which were large-scale training exercises held annually. These took place in the Pacific and the Caribbean Sea. During this period, she also took part in various ceremonies and naval reviews with the rest of the fleet. From 8 June to 26 September 1925, the ship participated in a voyage to visit Samoa, Australia, and New Zealand with several other battleships of the fleet. She ran aground on the Diamond Shoals off Cape Hatteras, North Carolina, on 1 May 1927, but was refloated on 2 May 1927. Colorado was overhauled in 1928–1929, during which her four  anti-aircraft guns were replaced by eight /25 caliber guns. From 10 to 11 March 1933, the ship went to Long Beach, California, to assist in relief efforts following an earthquake.

In the summer of 1937 Colorado was the training ship for NROTC students from the University of Washington and University of California, Berkeley. She embarked the University of Washington students in Puget Sound on 15 June, and the University of California students four days later in San Francisco Bay. The ship arrived in Hilo, Hawaii, on 26 June and sailed two days later for Lahaina Roads, where the students practiced firing the 5"/51 caliber guns in whose casemates they were berthed in hammocks. Liberty in Honolulu began on 1 July, but was interrupted the following day so Colorado could join the search for Amelia Earhart. She rendezvoused with the United States Coast Guard cutter  on 7 July; and launched seaplanes to search the Phoenix Islands. After holding a line-crossing ceremony on 9 July, she returned the NROTC students to their schools on the west coast.

World War II 

From 27 January 1941, Colorado was based in Pearl Harbor undergoing intensive training exercises and taking part in several war games until 25 June, when she departed Hawaii for the West Coast. Undergoing overhaul at the Puget Sound Navy Yard, she was not present for the attack on Pearl Harbor on 7 December. During the refit, which was completed on 31 March 1942, two of the 12 original 5 in/51 caliber guns were removed, and were replaced by an equal number of 5 in/38 caliber guns.

After refit Colorado carried out extensive training maneuvers along the West Coast.  On 31 May, she and  patrolled near Golden Gate Bridge to protect San Francisco from any Japanese attack. Some time after this she returned to Pearl Harbor to complete her final preparations for action. She operated in the vicinity of the Fiji Islands and New Hebrides from 8 November 1942 to 17 September 1943 to prevent any further Japanese expansion in the Pacific. She sailed from Pearl Harbor on 21 October 1943 to provide pre-invasion shelling and fire support for the invasion of Tarawa, returning to port on 7 December 1943. After another overhaul on the West Coast, Colorado returned to Lahaina Roads, in the Hawaiian Islands, on 21 January 1944 and sortied the next day for the Marshall Islands. She provided the pre-invasion bombardment and fire support for the invasions of Kwajalein and Eniwetok until 23 February, when she headed for the Puget Sound Navy Yard for another overhaul.

She joined other units going for the Mariana Islands at the harbor at San Francisco. She departed on 5 May passing Pearl Harbor and Kwajalein to the pre-invasion shelling at Saipan, Guam, and Tinian after 14 June. During the shelling of Tinian on 24 July she was damaged, 43 men were killed, and 198 wounded by 22 shell hits from 150mm Japanese shore batteries; she continued shelling the island and providing fire support for the invasion troops. After undergoing extensive repairs along the West Coast, she arrived in Leyte Gulf to begin the invasion of Leyte. A week after her arrival she was struck by two kamikaze bombers, which killed 19 crewmembers, injured 72, and moderately damaged the ship. Despite the damage, she bombarded Mindoro on schedule from 12 to 17 December 1944. She then proceeded to Manus Island for urgent repairs.

She returned to Luzon on New Year's Day 1945 to participate in the pre-invasion shelling of Lingayen Gulf. She was hit by accidental gunfire eight days later. The gunfire hit her superstructure, and caused 69 casualties (18 killed, 51 wounded). After a few repairs at the island of Ulithi, she joined Task Force 54 (TF 54), the pre-invasion shelling group for the invasion of Okinawa, at Kerama Retto. She stayed at Okinawa until 22 May, providing anti-aircraft cover and fire support for the invasion troops. On 6 August, she returned to the occupied Okinawa to sail to Japan for its occupation. On 27 August, she covered the airborne occupation of Atsugi Airfield. Colorado was awarded seven battle stars for her World War II service.

Post war
Colorado departed Tokyo Bay on 20 September 1945 for San Francisco. She arrived there on 15 October, and then sailed for Seattle for Navy Day (27 October). She was part of the Operation Magic Carpet force, making three runs to Pearl Harbor to transport 6357 soldiers home, before returning to Bremerton Navy Yard for her deactivation. She was placed out of commission in reserve on 7 January 1947 and was sold for scrap on 23 July 1959.

Artifacts on display 

The ship's bell is currently on display in the University Memorial Center (UMC) at the University of Colorado. A /51 cal deck gun from Colorado was donated to the Puget Sound Maritime Historical Society in 1959, and is displayed at the Museum of History and Industry in Seattle. It was one of eight such guns on Colorado.

Six of Colorados 5/51 cal guns were put aboard the protected cruiser , after she became a museum in Philadelphia in 1957. Boards from her teak-wood deck were re-purposed to form a wall in the main lounge of Haggett Hall at the University of Washington. A plaque commemorates the source. Deck boards are also used in a wall in the Legends Room of the Washington Athletic Club, having originally been preserved within the club at the behest of two former officers of the ship who were club members.

On 7 February 2014, Boeing donated some decking from Colorado to the USO Northwest SeaTac Center to serve as the new center's entry flooring. Her helm is in the collection of the Colorado Springs Museum. It was donated to the museum in 1961 by Rear Admiral G. R. Luker and other naval officers. Admiral Luker served on Colorado. The donation also included a bronze plaque and other historical materials.

Footnotes

Explanatory notes

Citations

References

External links 

 MaritimeQuest USS Colorado BB-45 photo gallery
 
 DANFS photograph collection of USS Colorado (BB-45)

1921 ships
Colorado-class battleships
Ships built by New York Shipbuilding Corporation
World War II battleships of the United States
Maritime incidents in 1927
Maritime incidents in January 1945
Friendly fire incidents of World War II